Gonçalo Manuel Ganchinho Guedes (born 29 November 1996) is a Portuguese professional footballer who plays as a winger for Primeira Liga club Benfica, on loan from Premier League club Wolverhampton Wanderers, and the Portugal national team.

Guedes began his career at Benfica, making his professional debut for the reserves in April 2014 and the first team six months later. After 11 goals in 63 matches across all competitions, winning five major trophies, he transferred to Paris Saint-Germain for a €30 million transfer fee in January 2017. He played only 13 matches for PSG before being loaned to Valencia in September 2017, joining them on a permanent basis for a €40 million transfer fee a year later. He played 178 games and scored 36 goals for the Spanish club, winning the Copa del Rey in 2019, and signed for Wolverhampton Wanderers for £27.5 million in 2022.

Guedes earned 57 caps for Portugal at youth level, from under-15 to under-23. He made his senior international debut in November 2015, at age 18, and played at the 2018 FIFA World Cup. He scored the winning goal for Portugal in the 2019 UEFA Nations League Final.

Club career

Benfica
Born in Benavente, Guedes joined S.L. Benfica's youth system in 2005, where he progressed to the juniors team. On his debut at age eight, he scored all of the goals in a 5–0 win against a team of boys three years older. He was part of Benfica's squad in the inaugural UEFA Youth League in 2013–14, contributing to their victories over Paris Saint-Germain, Anderlecht, Manchester City and Real Madrid en route to the final.

On 19 April 2014, he made his professional debut with Benfica B in a 2013–14 Segunda Liga match against Porto B, playing 21 minutes of an eventual 4–1 away loss before being replaced by Rudinilson Silva.

On 18 October 2014, Guedes debuted for Benfica's first team at Sporting da Covilhã in the third round of Taça de Portugal. On 4 January 2015, he debuted in the Primeira Liga at Penafiel as an added-time substitute for Lima in a 3–0 victory. On 4 July, he won the 2014–15 Segunda Liga's Breakthrough Player of the Year award.

On 26 September 2015, Guedes scored his first goal with Benfica in a 3–0 victory against Paços de Ferreira in the league. On 30 September, he scored his first goal in the UEFA Champions League in a victory at Atlético Madrid (2–1), and became the youngest Portuguese player to have scored a goal in the group stage. He was praised by opposing manager Diego Simeone after the match.

While mainly used as a right-winger at Benfica, he played some matches as a false 9 center-forward due to injury to striker Jonas.

Paris Saint-Germain
On 25 January 2017, Guedes joined Paris Saint-Germain for a €30 million transfer fee, signing a contract lasting until 2021. Upon signing, he said that he wanted to emulate compatriot and former PSG player Pauleta. PSG won a bidding war with Manchester United for his signature.

Guedes made his debut for the Ligue 1 title holders four days later, replacing fellow newcomer Julian Draxler for the final three minutes of a 1–1 home draw with Monaco.

Valencia
On 1 September 2017, Guedes was loaned to Spanish club Valencia on a season-long deal. The transfer was facilitated by the contacts between his agent Jorge Mendes and the owners of Valencia.

Guedes made his La Liga debut eight days later, replacing Andreas Pereira for the final half hour of a goalless home draw against Atlético Madrid. On 15 October, Guedes scored the first goal of his loan in a 6–3 win at Real Betis, as his unbeaten team rose to second above Real Madrid. Six days later, he scored twice and assisted Santi Mina in a 4–0 win over Sevilla, the Che team's fifth consecutive victory. He received plaudits from the international sporting press for his early-season form.

On 30 August 2018, Guedes signed permanently to Valencia on a deal running until 2024, for an initial club-record €40 million fee potentially including a further €17 million; the release clause was €300 million. From December until February 2019, he was sidelined with a pubalgia. He played in the 2019 Copa del Rey Final on 25 May, with Valencia defeating Barcelona 2–1 to win the club's first honour in 11 years.

From October 2019 until the following February, Guedes was out with a right ankle injury. On 30 December, he was sent off for swearing at the referee in a 2–1 loss at Granada. He had the most prolific season of his career in 2021–22, finishing as his team's joint top scorer alongside Carlos Soler with 11, while also playing the most games with 36 and most minutes with over 2,500; this included two goals in a 4–3 win at Levante in the Valencia derby on 20 December. In March 2022, his long-range strike against Athletic Bilbao was the decisive goal that sent his team to another Copa final.

Wolverhampton Wanderers

On 8 August 2022, Premier League side Wolverhampton Wanderers signed Guedes on a five-year deal for £27.5 million. He made his debut five days later as a 58th-minute substitute for Hwang Hee-chan in a goalless draw with Fulham, and on 20 August made his first start in a 1–0 away defeat at Tottenham Hotspur.

Return to Benfica 
On 20 January 2023, Guedes returned to his old club Benfica on a loan for the remainder of the 2022–23 season.

International career
Guedes was first called-up by Portugal first-team manager Fernando Santos on 6 November 2015 ahead of international friendlies against Russia and Luxembourg. He made his debut eight days later against the former, starting in a 1–0 loss in Krasnodar, which made him the first 18-year-old to represent the nation since Cristiano Ronaldo.

On 10 November 2017, Guedes scored his first senior international goal in a 3–0 friendly win over Saudi Arabia in Viseu, also assisting Manuel Fernandes earlier in the match.

Guedes was named in Portugal's 23-man squad for the 2018 FIFA World Cup in Russia. In the final warm-up match before the tournament, he scored twice in a 3–0 win over Algeria at the Estádio da Luz.

At the 2019 UEFA Nations League Finals, hosted on home soil, Guedes was a substitute for João Félix in the semi-final victory over Switzerland but started the final at the Estádio do Dragão against the Netherlands, during which he scored the match's only goal.

In October 2022, he was named in Portugal's preliminary 55-man squad for the 2022 FIFA World Cup in Qatar.

Career statistics

Club

International

Scores and results list Portugal's goal tally first, score column indicates score after each Guedes goal.

Honours
Benfica
Primeira Liga: 2014–15, 2015–16, 2016–17
Taça de Portugal: 2016–17
Taça da Liga: 2014–15, 2015–16
Supertaça Cândido de Oliveira: 2016
Paris Saint-Germain
Ligue 1: 2017–18
Coupe de France: 2016–17
Trophée des Champions: 2017
Valencia
Copa del Rey: 2018–19

Portugal
UEFA Nations League: 2018–19

Individual
Segunda Liga Breakthrough Player of the Year: 2014–15
SJPF Segunda Liga Player of the Month: October and December 2014

Notes

References

External links

 
 
 

1996 births
Living people
People from Benavente, Portugal
Sportspeople from Santarém District
Portuguese footballers
Association football forwards
Primeira Liga players
Liga Portugal 2 players
S.L. Benfica B players
S.L. Benfica footballers
Ligue 1 players
Paris Saint-Germain F.C. players
La Liga players
Valencia CF players
Premier League players
Wolverhampton Wanderers F.C. players
Portuguese expatriate footballers
Portuguese expatriate sportspeople in France
Portuguese expatriate sportspeople in Spain
Portuguese expatriate sportspeople in England
Expatriate footballers in France
Expatriate footballers in Spain
Expatriate footballers in England
Portugal youth international footballers
Portugal under-21 international footballers
Portugal international footballers
2018 FIFA World Cup players
UEFA Euro 2020 players
UEFA Nations League-winning players